Simpson Creek Covered Bridge is located in Bridgeport, West Virginia, crossing Simpson Creek off Meadowbrook Road near the entrance to the Meadowbrook Mall.  The ,  multiple-kingpost truss bridge was built in 1881 by Asa Hugill.  The current location of the bridge is not the original location.  It was washed out by a flood in July 1889 and later relocated to its current location a half-mile upstream from its original spot.  The Simpson Creek and Fletcher Covered Bridges, are the only two remaining covered bridges in Harrison County, are examples of this truss design.

Upgrades
In fall of 2001, the West Virginia Division of Highways used nearly $400,000 to renovate the Simpson Creek Covered Bridge.  The improvements include a new timber deck, wooden exterior siding and a fresh coat of paint.

See also
List of West Virginia covered bridges

References

Buildings and structures in Harrison County, West Virginia
Transportation in Harrison County, West Virginia
Tourist attractions in Harrison County, West Virginia
Covered bridges on the National Register of Historic Places in West Virginia
Wooden bridges in West Virginia
Bridges completed in 1889
National Register of Historic Places in Harrison County, West Virginia
Road bridges on the National Register of Historic Places in West Virginia
Bridgeport, West Virginia
King post truss bridges in the United States